Privolnoye is a rural locality (a selo) in Dubovsky Selsoviet of Mikhaylovsky District, Amur Oblast, Russia. The population was 50 as of 2018. There are 2 streets.

Geography 
Privolnoye is located 30 km northeast of Poyarkovo (the district's administrative centre) by road. Dubovoye is the nearest rural locality.

References 

Rural localities in Mikhaylovsky District, Amur Oblast